Welch Factory Building No. 1 is a historic grape juice factory located at Westfield in Chautauqua County, New York. It was built in 1897 and expanded in 1899 and 1903, to be an 8-bay wide, 10-bay deep rectangular building. It is the oldest extant structure associated with the Welch's company.

It was listed on the National Register of Historic Places in 1983.

The plant was built by Charles E. Welch and is only 17 miles from the current Welch's facility in North East, PA. Dr. Welch opened the plant in Chautauqua County, the largest grape growing county outside of California.  The plant was built along a spur of the New York, Chicago and St. Louis Railroad and is still located near a rail line for Conrail\CSX, though no longer having rail access.

References

External links

Industrial buildings and structures on the National Register of Historic Places in New York (state)
Industrial buildings completed in 1897
Buildings and structures in Chautauqua County, New York
National Register of Historic Places in Chautauqua County, New York
Grape juice